Puzzle de Harvest Moon is a spin-off puzzle video game in the Harvest Moon series. It was developed by Platinum-Egg Inc. and published by Natsume on November 6, 2007.

Puzzle de Harvest Moon is retrospectively the first entry in Natsume's Harvest Moon series as separate from Marvelous's Story of Seasons series (which was until 2014 marketed as Harvest Moon in Western markets).

Gameplay
Puzzle de Harvest Moon is a strategy game in which the object is to harvest plants from a small field shared by four players. Farm animals the player periodically receives give special abilities in a small area; for example the dog protects an area for a short period of time from other players harvesting.

Puzzle de Harvest Moon features characters from Harvest Moon: Back to Nature as playable characters, four single-player modes, and multi-player mode where up to four players can play together, with one game cartridge.

Reception

Puzzle de Harvest Moon received mostly negative reviews, receiving an aggregate score of 41/100 from Metacritic. The critics claimed that the puzzle gameplay is unfitting for a Harvest Moon game. It also received criticism for its tutorial, which was claimed to make the game more confusing, and for not having a story for single player mode or any extended play modes. GameSpot refers to it as a scribbling exercise.

References

2007 video games
Nintendo DS games
Nintendo DS-only games
North America-exclusive video games
Video games developed in Japan
Puzzle video games
Story of Seasons spin-off games